iNo Mobile is a Singapore based mobile phone company that designs, develops and markets mobile phones for niche markets. iNo Mobile is a subsidiary company of Foresight Manufacture (S) Pte Ltd. Their mobile phones are primarily targeted at the elderly, the children of the elderly, namely, the ageing population. The Company’s key activities include Research and Development, System Integration and the manufacturing of mobile phones targeted mainly at the silver hair group. Its annual turnover was S$7.2 million for the financial year ending 2009.

Founder 
Kenneth Lau is the founder of Foresight Manufacture (S) Pte Ltd, trademark owner of "iNO" and internationally recognized as Singapore’s pioneer manufacturer and leader of technology and mobile phone solutions that caters to the silver hair community.

History 
The Start of Something Big

iNo Mobile first entered the mobile phone market in 2008 with the primary purpose of serving the elderly market, which was non-existent at that time. iNo's first product, the iNo CP09, was launched in 2009 and was a huge success. Sales revenue reached a few million dollars within a few months and was featured on both local and international press. Their success was attributed greatly to their in-depth understanding of the real needs of the elderly market and addressing these needs adequately.

Products 
Expanding into Other Markets

Other than serving the elderly market, iNo managed to address the needs of men serving National Service (NS) in Singapore as well. In NS, it was a requirement that mobile phones brought into the camp must not have camera function. Hence, iNo's phones met this requirement and was popular among NS men. However, from 1 September 2012, camera mobile phones will be permitted within 14 Singapore Armed Forces (SAF) camps, which was subsequently increased to include more camps on 1 September 2013. As a result, iNO has been losing market share in the NS men market since camera-equipped mobile devices were permitted in SAF camps.

iNo Mobile launched iNo ONE, the world's first non-camera smartphone in 2012, catering to the small group of people that works in sensitive environment where image capturing devices are strictly not allowed. The iNo Mobile was approved by the Singapore military for use in sensitive areas.

Phones 
 iNo CP100 (Black/Red)
 iNo Red Dot
 iNo Scout 2
 iNo Simple Phone for Senior Citizens
 iNo 2 Non-Camera Smartphone

Accessories 
 iNo Liquid Screen Protector
 iNo Scout 4500mAh Battery
 iNo 2 Hard Case
 iNo 2 Tempered Glass Screen Protector

Wearable 
Coming Soon!

Lifestyle 
Coming Soon!

Project Senior Activities Centre (SAC) 
iNo Mobile is a partner in Project SAC and brings smartphones to senior citizens and their caregivers to aid them in care management. One of the key feature of this project is the launcher developed for seniors to use through the iNo Simple Mobile Phone. The launcher includes 1. Emergency SMS alert to caregiver 2. Location tracking through SMS. Center management can monitor the wellness and attendance of seniors through a website portal as well. This greatly ease the difficulties of jobs for caregivers and allows them to monitor more seniors at a time. Project SAC is looking into areas of home motion tracking and health management to be included into their launcher in the future.

iNo Simple Mobile Phone 
The iNO Simple Mobile Phone, with its unique SOS feature, is the perfect way to ensure the safety of your loved ones at all times. This easy-to-use mobile phone contains the basic features of a phone (calls, SMS, screen display) plus the following additional features:
 Large clear buttons
 Speed dial function
 SOS button
 In-built torchlight
 FM Speaker radio
 Camera
 Language options of English or Chinese
Speed Dial Function: Up to 10 pre-programmed numbers can be dialed by simply pressing and holding the respective button.SOS Button: SOS button is located at the back of the phone. Once activated, the phone will emit an alarm to alert people in the immediate surroundings, while an SMS will be sent to up to 5 pre-programmed numbers of your choice. Simultaneously, it will begin to call each number till the call is answered.

Future and Overseas Markets 
Going Forward

iNo Mobile will continue to focus on serving niche markets which are under-served. This resonates well with iNo's motto "爱的深诺", meaning true love in English, as they continue to care for and understand the needs of the overlooked markets and develop products for these markets accordingly.

Major customers of iNo Mobile 

 Malaysia 
 Out of the 13 states of Malaysia, 7 of them (namely Johor, Malacca, Sabah and Sarawak) distribute the iNo Mobile. Similar to Singapore's National Service regulations, National Service of Malaysia also discourage their soldiers and recruits in bringing phones with camera function into their bunks and camps due to privacy issues, rules and regulations. 
 Taiwan
 One of their resellers is 'Yan Do Inc. 盈多有限公司'.
 Kuwait
 Situated in Al-Mangaf, a suburb in Kuwait City, in Al-Azizya Commercial Complex.

References

2008 establishments in Singapore
Mobile phone companies of Singapore
Telecommunications companies established in 2008